Zewde or Zewdie is a male given name of Ethiopian origin that may refer to:

Alem Zewde Tessema (died 1974), Ethiopian military figure
Sahle-Work Zewde, United Nations official
Terefe Maregu Zewdie (born 1982), Ethiopian long-distance runner
Hailu Zewde (born 1974), Ethiopian male middle-distance runner at the 1992 Summer Olympics
Zewdie Hailemariam (born 1962 or 1972), Ethiopian female middle-distance runner at the 1992 Summer Olympics

Ethiopian given names
Amharic-language names